Sven Mende (born 18 January 1994) is a German professional footballer who plays as a midfielder for FC St. Pauli II.

Club career
Mende was born in Göppingen.

On 28 July 2012, he made his debut for VfB Stuttgart II in the 3. Liga against Kickers Offenbach as a substitute for Erich Berko.

On 24 January 2013, he moved to Karlsruher SC.

International career
At the 2011 European U-17 Championship and the 2011 FIFA U-17 World Cup Mende played for Germany.

References

External links
 
 
 
 

1994 births
Living people
People from Göppingen
Sportspeople from Stuttgart (region)
German footballers
Footballers from Baden-Württemberg
Association football midfielders
VfB Stuttgart II players
Karlsruher SC players
SV Wehen Wiesbaden players
VfB Lübeck players
FC Schalke 04 II players
FC St. Pauli II players
3. Liga players
Regionalliga players
Germany youth international footballers